is Kaori Iida's second studio album as a solo artist of Hello! Project, and her second album covering songs in European languages. It was released on October 22, 2003, when she was still a member of the idol group, Morning Musume.

Track listing
  originally Παραδινομαι (Paradinome) by Haris Alexiou
  originally Un jour, un enfant by Frida Boccara
  originally Les Champs Élysées by Joe Dassin
  originally Αχ! η ζωή (Ah! i zoi) by Konstantina
  originally Pull Marine by Isabelle Adjani
  originally Cielo by Little Peggy March
  originally Un Buco Nella Sabbia by Mina
  originally Δρόμοι λησμονημένοι (Dromi Lismonimeni) by Haris Alexiou
  originally Non ho l'età per amarti by Gigliola Cinquetti
  originally To Giasemi, a traditional Cypriot song

External links
 Up-Front Works Kaori Iida discography: Paradinome: Koi ni Mi o Yudanete entry

Kaori Iida albums
Chichūkai Label albums
2003 albums